Stenocorus cylindricollis is a species of beetle from family Cerambycidae. The species are either black or brown coloured.

References

Lepturinae
Beetles described in 1824